Churchtown is an unincorporated community in Washington County, in the U.S. state of Ohio.

History
A post office was established at Churchtown in 1875, and remained in operation until 1907. The Churchtown post office originally was housed in a Catholic church, hence the name.

References

Unincorporated communities in Washington County, Ohio
Unincorporated communities in Ohio